The national Child Care Policy Research Consortium consists of grantees and contractors who have worked on research projects and partnerships funded by ACF. The purpose of this consortium is to help ACF increase national capacity for sound child care research, identify and respond to critical issues, and link child care research with policy and practice.

The consortium meets annually to provide an opportunity for participants to highlight new research activities and findings, work collaboratively on important technical issues, consider emerging research and policy concerns, build cross-cutting partnerships and peer relationships, and produce new ideas for the next generation of research. Papers, posters, presentations, and discussion summaries from the meetings are posted on the Research Connections website (http://www.researchconnections.org).

Child-related organizations in the United States